Priyanath Mukhopadhyay (4 June 1855—20 June 1947) was a Bengali writer and police detective in Calcutta during the British era. He is considered a pioneer in the field of mystery and detective fiction in Bengali literature.

Career 
Mukhopadhyay was born in Chuadanga, undivided Nadia in British India. He was an inspector at Lalbazar Police Station in the detective department of the Calcutta Police. He worked in the department for 33 years, from 1878 to 1911. He was a detective of the Calcutta Police. The British Government gave him the title of Roybahadur (রায়বাহাদুর) for his excellent record in solving crimes in the city.

In 1889, he began writing accounts of some of his cases in the journal Anusandhaan, before moving in 1892 to Darogar Daptar (The Inspector's Files) devoted solely to his stories, writing 206 stories over the next 11 years. Many of his self-proclaimed experiences written in Darogar Daptar were actually stories heavily inspired by foreign authors like Sir Arthur Conan Doyle and others.

He wrote his autobiography in 1911.

References 

Indian mystery writers
1855 births
1947 deaths
Bengali writers
Indian writers
Indian male writers
Indian autobiographers
Indian memoirists
19th-century Indian male writers
20th-century Indian male writers
People from Nadia district
Writers from West Bengal
20th-century Bengalis
Bengali Hindus
Bengali detective fiction writers
Police officers from Kolkata
20th-century Indian writers
19th-century Indian writers